Dongfeng Beiqiao is a station on Line 14 of the Beijing Subway. It is located just inside the East 4th Ring Road North in the Jiangtai area of Chaoyang District. The station opened on 28 December 2014.

Station layout 
The station has an underground island platform. It is situated on a section of a 1000-metre-radius curve.

Exits 
There are 4 exits, lettered B, C1, C2, and D. Exit C1 is accessible.

References

Railway stations in China opened in 2014
Beijing Subway stations in Chaoyang District